General Cannon may refer to:

Howard Cannon (1912–2002), U.S. Air Force Reserve major general
Jerry Cannon (fl. 1960s–2020s), U.S. Army major general
John K. Cannon (1892–1955), U.S. Air Force general
Robert Milchrist Cannon (1901–1976), U.S. Army lieutenant general

See also
Fernando Canon (1860–1938), Filipino revolutionary general